Riccardo Lanari is an electrical engineer at Consiglio Nazionale delle Ricerche (CNR) in Naples, Italy. He was named a Fellow of the Institute of Electrical and Electronics Engineers (IEEE) in 2013 for his contributions to synthetic aperture radar processing.

References

Fellow Members of the IEEE
Living people
Engineers from Naples
Year of birth missing (living people)
Place of birth missing (living people)